The final of the Men's 100 metres Breaststroke event at the European LC Championships 1997 was held on Tuesday 19 August 1997 in Seville, Spain.

Finals

Qualifying heats

See also
1996 Men's Olympic Games 100m Breaststroke
1997 Men's World Championships (SC) 100m Breaststroke

References
 scmsom results
 La Gazetta Archivio
 swimrankings

B